Marcin Rafał Jewtuch  (born April 17, 1973) is an internationally notable Polish amateur snooker player. He also commentates on snooker matches for Polish Eurosport.

Tournament wins

Amateur
 Poland Senior International Team Championship - 2002
 147 Club Open - 2003

External links
 Player profile on Global Snooker
 Player profile on snooker.pl

Living people
Polish snooker players
1973 births
Sportspeople from Warsaw